Rumi Kancha (Quechua rumi stone, kancha corral, "stone corral", also spelled Rumi Cancha) is a mountain in the Andes of Bolivia which reaches a height of approximately . It is located in the Potosí Department, Nor Chichas Province, Cotagaita Municipality. Rumi Kancha lies south of Achakanayuq.

References 

Mountains of Potosí Department